Jeymes Samuel (born July 27, 1979), also known by his stage name The Bullitts, is a British singer-songwriter, music producer and filmmaker. His debut album, They Die By Dawn & Other Short Stories..., was issued in 2013. The Harder They Fall, released in 2021, serves as his feature film directorial debut, which won him the 2021 BAFTA Award for Outstanding Debut by a British Writer, Director or Producer.

Life and career

Samuel initially embarked on a career in filmmaking, having shot his first reels at the age of eight. However he began making music at the age of 13. In the year 2000, he released "When It Rains", his debut single in the form of a 12", under his real name on Giant Step Records. On 1 January 2002, in conjunction with Little League Productions, he released Urban Folk Music: The Prequel. That same year contributed background vocals on the song "The Proud", from American rapper Talib Kweli's debut album, Quality. In 2004, he wrote "Serenade", for Icelandic singer Emilíana Torrini's 2005 album Fisherman's Woman. Little League Productions later debuted Samuel's new moniker and released his single "The Bullitts Theme" in 2007.

In 2009, Samuel wrote and co-produced three songs on fellow British singer Mr Hudson's album Straight No Chaser, namely "Straight No Chaser", "Everything Is Broken" (featuring Kid Cudi) and "Time”. In March 2010, he joined a choir called The Purple, The People, The Plastic Eating People. The choir contributed background vocals on the songs "Some Kind of Nature" (featuring Lou Reed) and "Pirate Jet", from the third album by Gorillaz, Plastic Beach (2010).

In 2010, Samuel began uploading "FlixTapes" to YouTube under the pseudonym The Bullitts, named in honour of the 1968 film Bullitt; this was a series of videos in which he added new vocals to his favourite movie and television themes. The first episode, titled "Tales of the Unexpected", was released on 14 November 2010.

"Close Your Eyes", the lead single from his then-upcoming album, premiered in April 2011. The single features narration by American actress Lucy Liu and a verse from American rapper Jay Electronica. Its music video is a re-imagining of the Salvador Dalí and Luis Buñuel film, Un Chien Andalou. In May 2011, the album's second single, "Landspeeder", was released. "Landspeeder" was later included on the original motion picture soundtrack to the British 2011 slasher film Demons Never Die.

He issued "Weirdo" in July 2011, a short piece starring Jesse Williams. In it, two young lovers in paper-bag masks spend a day on the streets of London before robbing a newsagents during a declaration of love. For the song "Run and Hide", by Jay Electronica, he directed a film noir in Paris, based around the actress Elisa Lasowski. Samuel played at The Big Chill music festival on 6 August 2011; he was joined onstage by Liu, Electronica and English actor Idris Elba.

The album's third single, titled "Supercool", was premiered on Lowe's show on 4 October 2011. Its accompanying music video featured he dressed as a homeless individual being harassed by someone filming him against his will; during this he bumps into actress Rosario Dawson, and the pair end up having a dance off on the streets of Soho. In 2011, he wrote "Wonderful Life", alongside Estelle Swaray, for Swaray's third album All of Me (2012). In late 2012, he was handpicked by Baz Luhrmann and Jay-Z to be Executive Music Consultant for the soundtrack to the film The Great Gatsby (2013).

In early 2013, Samuel wrote, directed and scored the short film titled They Die By Dawn, with an all star cast that includes Michael K. Williams, Erykah Badu, Isaiah Washington, Jesse Williams and Rosario Dawson. The film is set in Langston, Oklahoma in 1890 and is a gun-slinging, black cowboy western. Samuel's first album under the moniker The Bullitts, is titled They Die By Dawn & Other Short Stories... and was released on 9 July 2013. The album was produced entirely by himself and features guest appearances from Jay Electronica, Lucy Liu, Mos Def, Rosario Dawson, Doxi Jones and Tori Amos.

In 2021, he directed and co-wrote The Harder They Fall, a revisionist western starring Jonathan Majors, Zazie Beetz, and RJ Cyler. The film, which was initially titled The Notorious Nine, was in development for several years.

In 2022, Netflix announced that Samuel will direct the feature film adaptations of Irredeemable and Incorruptible. In March 2022, it was announced American musician Kid Cudi would direct a film titled Teddy, which would be executive produced by Samuel, alongside Jay-Z and James Lassiter.

Artistry
Samuel is on record saying “As a musician, I've always regarded myself as, at root, a folk musician. My voice and my acoustic guitar.” There is a cinematic element to his music and he has created a short film to accompany most of his releases.

In a November 2021 interview, Samuel said “My influences musically go back further than time itself. If I'm outside the house, I'm listening to Wu-Tang Clan and Mobb Deep and Jay-Z and Nas. If I'm inside the house, I'm listening to Crosby, Stills and Nash, Joni Mitchell, Jackson Browne. So my brain is always cooking everything together in both film and music and drawing from all of my influences, and bringing them into the present.”

Personal life
Samuel's older brother is Henry Samuel, better known as Seal. His mother, Adebisi Ogundeji is Nigerian, and his father, Francis Samuel is Afro-Brazilian.

Discography

The discography of The Bullitts consists of one studio album, one soundtrack album, one mixtape and nine singles.

Studio albums

Soundtrack albums

Mixtapes

Singles

Guest appearances

Notes

Production discography

Filmography

Films

Music videos
As lead artist

As featured artist

Awards and nominations

References

External links
 
 
 
 
 
 
 
 
 They Die By Dawn

1979 births
Living people
21st-century Black British male singers
English male singer-songwriters
British hip hop singers
English pop musicians
English record producers
Musicians from London
British alternative rock musicians
Alternative hip hop musicians
English people of Nigerian descent
People from Paddington
Yoruba musicians
British male songwriters
British filmmakers
English people of Yoruba descent
Alternative R&B musicians
English people of Brazilian descent
British male film score composers